The Kuyavian-Pomeranian Voivodeship Sejmik is the regional legislature of the Voivodeship of Kuyavia-Pomerania in Poland. It is a unicameral parliamentary body consisting of thirty councillors chosen during regional elections for a five-year term. The current chairperson of the assembly is Ryszard Bober.

The assembly elects the executive board that acts as the collective executive for the regional government, headed by the voivodeship marshal. The current Executive Board of Silesia is a coalition government between the Civic Coalition, Polish People's Party and Democratic Left Alliance. The board's current chief executive is Marshal Piotr Całbecki of Civic Coalition.

The assembly convenes within the Marshal's Office in Toruń.

Leadership of the Assembly 

The Chairperson of the Assembly (speaker or president) presides over the Assembly in the chief leadership position, controlling the flow of legislation. The Chairperson and two Vice-Chairpersons are elected by the coalition parties, followed by confirmation of the full Assembly on passage of a floor vote. Other Assembly leaders, such as the Group Chairperson (Przewodniczący Koła Radnych, Chairperson of Councillors' Club) are elected by internal rules.

Officers 
 Chairperson of the Assembly - Ryszard Bober, PSL
 Vice-Chairperson of the Assembly - Wojciech Jaranowski
 Vice-Chairperson of the Assembly - Łukasz Krupa
 Vice-Chairperson of the Assembly - Elżbieta Piniewska

Districts 

Members of the assembly are elected from six districts and serve five-year terms. Districts does not have the constituencies' formal names. Instead, each constituency has a number and territorial description.

See also 
 Polish Regional Assembly
 Kuyavian-Pomeranian Voivodeship

Charts

References

External links 
 Official website
 Executive board official website

Kuyavian-Pomeranian
Assembly
Unicameral legislatures